Padang Lawas is an archaeological site in Indonesia in Padang Lawas Regency and North Padang Lawas Regency in North Sumatra.

The remains of Hindu-Buddhist temple complex are located there. The most well-preserved temple are the Bahal temple complex, however most of other temples are in ruins. There are, however, no effective controls over the management of the remains of the numerous temples at the site.  A research worker from the Medan State University recently (2011) expressed the view that up to half of the 16 temples in the area were at risk of being illegally excavated and noted that groups of thieves had been observed working at some of the temples.

References

Archaeological sites in Indonesia